Izu no odoriko (Dancing girl from Izu) is a drama that first aired on TV Tokyo in two parts on June 14, 1993 and June 21, 1993.

Cast
Takuya Kimura as Yasunari Kawabata
Misato Hayase as the girl
Mariko Kaga

Synopsis
Based on a semi-autobiographical short story of the same title by Nobel Prize–winning author Yasunari Kawabata (in English translation, "The Dancing Girl of Izu"), the two-part drama tells the story of a young student who spends his holidays in the hills of Izu where he comes across a troupe of dancers. Fascinated by their gypsy life, he joins them for a few days and falls for the youngest dancing girl. A tentative love grows between them, but both know that this is on borrowed time and that the student has to return to his life of learning and eventually a highly paid career.

Films based on works by Yasunari Kawabata
Japanese drama television series
Television shows based on Japanese novels